Hassop railway station was a station situated about two miles from the village of Hassop in the Peak District of Derbyshire. It was opened in 1862 by the Midland Railway on its extension of the Manchester, Buxton, Matlock and Midlands Junction Railway from Rowsley.

It was built for the benefit of the Duke of Devonshire of Chatsworth House who, having previously declined to allow the railway to pass over the easier terrain of his lands, belatedly saw its possible benefit. Indeed, for a while it was renamed "Hassop for Chatsworth". However, in this sparsely populated area, it saw little use, and closed in 1942. It greatest usefulness was as a goods yard, which closed in 1964.

The station building has since been renovated by Hassop Station Ltd. Hassop Station is now a family friendly cafe with outdoor covered seating and play area, book shop, gift shop and cycle hire facility. Disabled access and toilets are available here, along with a large car park.

The trackbed is part of the Monsal Trail, a walk and cycleway. Four tunnels (located between the Great Longstone station and Topley Pike Junction sites) were reopened on the trail in May 2011, lengthening the trail to a continuous  for cyclists walkers and riders.

History
Opened by the Manchester, Buxton, Matlock and Midlands Junction Railway, then becoming part of the Midland Railway, the station  became part of the London, Midland and Scottish Railway during the Grouping of 1923. The station was host to a LMS caravan from 1934 to 1939. The station then closed to passengers in 1942.

Stationmasters

Samuel Buxton 1862 - 1875 (formerly station master at Desborough, afterwards station master at Belper)
J. Herbert 1875 - 1876 
W.H. Buxton 1876 - 1878 (afterwards station master at Hinckley)
Albert C. Bilham 1879 - 1891  (formerly station master at Ilkeston, afterwards station master at Bakewell)
Thomas Peel 1891 - 1895 (formerly station master at Barnoldswick, afterwards station master at Carnforth)
Frederic John Bent 1895 - 1912 (formerly station master at Barton-and-Walton)
William Horace Hough  1912 - 1918 (afterwards station master at Castle Donington)
U.R. Hawksley until 1923 (afterwards station master at Glapwell)
J. Townson 1923 - 1931 (formerly station master at Hampton-in-Arden, afterwards station master at Duffield)

From 1 October 1931 the stationmastership was merged with that of Bakewell.

Route

References

Railway stations in Great Britain opened in 1862
Railway stations in Great Britain closed in 1942
Disused railway stations in Derbyshire
Former Midland Railway stations
1862 establishments in England